Gary Raymond Stead (born 9 January 1972) is a New Zealand cricket coach and former cricketer who is the head coach of the New Zealand cricket team, having been appointed in August 2018.

A top-order batsman, Stead played five Tests in nine months in 1999, averaging 34.75 and never being dismissed in single figures. Against South Africa he showed his great character at Wellington, digging in and scoring 68 and 33, but after two mediocre performances against West Indies he was dropped. His Test call-up had come after eight years of first-class cricket with Canterbury, and he led them for five seasons from 1998–99 in a period when they struggled.

After he finished playing, he took up coaching and became coach of the successful New Zealand women's team. In August 2018, New Zealand Cricket appointed Stead coach of the New Zealand men's team, succeeding Mike Hesson.

After New Zealand's loss in a Super over against England in the 2019 World Cup, Stead criticised the decision of the ICC to go to a tie break and raised the idea of sharing the World Cup Trophy, a new system that was in place for the 2015 World Cup.

References

External links
 

1972 births
Living people
New Zealand Test cricketers
New Zealand cricketers
Canterbury cricketers
Cricketers from Christchurch
New Zealand cricket coaches